Summer in Abaddon is the third full-length album by indie rock band Pinback released through Touch & Go on October 12, 2004. The album was recorded in the home studio of Zach Smith and Rob Crow.

Track listing

Charts

References

External links
 Official website

Pinback albums
2004 albums
Touch and Go Records albums